The Qingdao Guoxin Haitian Eagle Club, also known as Qingdao Daily Fresh  or Qingdao Eagles are a Chinese professional basketball team which is based in Qingdao, Shandong. The club plays in the North Division of the Chinese Basketball Association (CBA). Conson DoubleStar is the club's corporate sponsor, and the team's mascot is an eagle. In the 2012–13 season, Basketball Hall of Famer Tracy McGrady played for the club. After the season, McGrady's jersey number was retired by Qingdao.

History
Qingdao received a great deal of attention from various media outlets around the world when former NBA All-Star Tracy McGrady signed for the 2012–13 CBA season with Qingdao. Despite McGrady averaging 25 points per game, the team was unable to qualify for the CBA Playoffs. In the 2014–15 CBA season, thanks to the extra addition of Hamed Haddadi, Qingdao received their first playoff appearance with the third-best record in the league, going as far as the semi-final round before being swept by the Liaoning Flying Leopards. In 2015, Qingdao retired McGrady's jersey number 1.

Players

Current roster

Notable players

  Shan Tao (2000–2001)
  Torraye Braggs (2006–2007)
  Chris Williams (2008–2010)
  Amal McCaskill (2009)
  Sabah Khoury (2009–2010)
  Dee Brown (2010–2011)
  Li Gen (2010–2012)
  Ivan Johnson (2011)
  Xue Yuyang (2011–2014)
  Olumide Oyedeji (2011–2012)
  D.J. Mbenga (2012)
  Tracy McGrady (2012–2013)(#1 retired by Qingdao)
  Chris Daniels (2012–2013)
  Josh Selby (2013)
  Peter John Ramos (2013–2014)
  Josh Akognon (2013–2014)
  Justin Dentmon (2014–2015)
  Hamed Haddadi (2014–2015)
  Mike Harris (2014–2015)
  Jonathan Gibson (2015–2016,2017–2019)
  Alan Williams (2015–2016)
  Su Wei (2016–2018)
  Loukas Mavrokefalidis (2016–2017)
  Terrence Jones (2017)
  Maciej Lampe (2017–2018)
  James Mays (2018)
  Darius Adams (2019–2021)
  Zhao Tailong (2019–present)
  Dakari Johnson  (2019–present)

Retired numbers

Basketball Hall of Famers

References

External links
Qingdao DoubleStar site
Team profile 
Official weibo 

Chinese Basketball Association teams
Sport in Qingdao
2003 establishments in China
Basketball teams established in 2003